Katsho Gewog (Dzongkha: སྐར་ཚོགས་, Kar-tshog Gewog) is a gewog (village block) of Haa District, Bhutan. Before substantial border changes, the gewog in 2007 had an area of 42.3 square kilometres and contained 10 villages and 247 households.

References 

Gewogs of Bhutan
Haa District